Sestra flexata, also known as the common fern looper, is a species of moth in the family Geometridae. This species is endemic to New Zealand. 

The larva of this species is coloured dark brown and is 25 to 30 mm long when mature. The older larvae of this species feed at night. The adult moths are on the wing from September until March. 

The larval hosts of this species are Pteris macilenta and Histiopteris incisa. When disturbed the larva will drop to the ground. Adults of this species pollinate Leptospermum scoparium.

References

Ennominae
Moths of New Zealand
Endemic fauna of New Zealand
Moths described in 1862
Taxa named by Francis Walker (entomologist)
Endemic moths of New Zealand